Georg Hartog Gerson (25 August 1788 – 3 December 1844) was a medical doctor and surgeon in the King's German Legion during the Napoleonic Wars.

Dr. Gerson was born in Hamburg. He came from a family of doctors who had been living and working in Hamburg and Altona since the 17th century. His grandfather was the principal of the Jewish hospital in Altona, his father and elder brothers were also medical doctors. After his education at home, he visited the secondary grammar school (Gymnasium) and specialised in the classical languages and natural sciences (especially in botany). He studied from 1805 at the university of Berlin and from 1809 at the university of Göttingen. Here he got his medical doctorate on 7 April 1810. He habilitated in Hamburg in 1811 and then joined the King's German Legion as hospital mate.

Military career

As soon as 12 August 1811 he was proposed for the position of Assistant Surgeon and received this commission on 6 September 1811 for the 5th Line Battalion, King's German Legion. He saw action in the Peninsula, in Southern France, the Lowlands and at the Battle of Waterloo.

A rare eagerness was seen in the assistant surgeon Gerson of this 5th line battalion, who not only stayed in the carree during the fiercest of fighting, dressing with fervour and skill the wounded of his battalion, but also caring for those of the neighbouring Hanoverian troops. In this way he saved the live of many brave men, voluntary exposing his own life, he rightly gained the admiration of every eyewitness, and Colonel von Ompteda, commander of the brigade, shortly before the charge which cost his life, expressed his great appreciation publicly.

After the battle Gerson was in charge of the Hôpital de la Gendàmerie in Brussels.

Civilian career

After the legion was dissolved in 1816 he returned to Hamburg and was in the beginning mainly working as an author, but his surgery was expanding quickly and he gained a reputation as doctor and surgeon. In 1833 he was appointed as teacher for anatomy at the medical-surgery school and worked also from time to time as chief surgeon at the Allgemeine Krankenhaus. In 1839 he became sick with a chronic disease which led to his sudden death on 3 December 1844 in Hamburg. His graveside was in the Jewish cemetery the Grindelfriedhof. In the time of the Third Reich the cemetery was dissolved and the dead were reburied with their gravestones in the Jewish Cemetery Ohlsdorf. There his memorial can still be seen today. The inscription on one side reads:

Mitissimus Aggressor – Acerrimus Defensor (a mild aggressor – a sharp defender).

His uniform jacket, that he (presumably) wore at the battle of Waterloo is in the Hamburg Museum, the Museum für Hamburgische Geschichte (Museum for the History of Hamburg).It is believed to be the only jacket of a surgeon of the British/allied forces from the Napoleonic times, still in existence.

Honorary distinctions
Waterloo Medal (Britain)

Publications
Magazin der ausländischen Litteratur der gesammten Heilkunde (Editor 1817–19 and 1821–35, Hamburg) (de)
De forma corneae oculi humani (Dissertation, Göttingen 1810) (Latin)
Über den Hospitalbrand nach eigenen, während des spanischen Befreiungskrieges und in Belgien gemachten Erfahrungen (Hoffmann und Campe, Hamburg 1817) (de)

References

Literature in German and English
Literatur von und über Georg Hartog Gerson im Karlsruher Virtuellen Katalog (de)
Beamish, N.Ludlow: History of the King's German Legion, 2 Vol. 1832 and 1837. (reprint) Naval & Military Press, Dallington, East Sussex, 1997, 2 Volumes 
Beamish, N.Ludlow: Geschichte der Königlich Deutschen Legion Band 2 1837 ('Google books' page 387f )
Führer durch das Museum für Hamburgische Geschichte (Guide through the Museum for Hamburg's History) (de)
Michael, J.: Geschichte des ärztlichen Vereins und seiner Mitglieder, Hamburg 1896 (de)
Schröder: Lexikon hamburgischer Schriftsteller 1854 (de)

External links
King's German Legion (de)

1788 births
1844 deaths
German surgeons
Physicians from Hamburg
British Army personnel of the Napoleonic Wars
King's German Legion
German military personnel of the Napoleonic Wars